Gheorghe Naghi (18 August 1932 – 10 March 2019) was a Romanian film director and actor. He directed 25 films between 1955 and 1991.

Filmography
 După concurs (1955)
 Două lozuri (1957)
 D-ale carnavalului (1958) 
 Telegrame (1959) 
 Bădăranii (1960) - with Sică Alexandrescu
 Lumina de iulie (1963)
 Globul de cristal (1964) 
 Vremea zăpezilor (1966) 
 Cine va deschide ușa? (1967)
 Doi bărbați pentru o moarte (1969) 
 Legende contemporane (1972) 
 Aventuri la Marea Neagră (1972)
 Aventurile lui Babușca (1973)
 Viața obligată (1974) 
 Elixirul tinereții (1975) 
 Alarmă în deltă (1975)  
 Reacții (1976) 
 Ultima poveste (1976)  
 Ciocolata cu alune (1978)
 Dumbrava minunată (film) (1980)  
 Fiul munților (1981)  
 Acțiunea Zuzuc (1984)  
 Taina jocului de cuburi (1990)
 De-aș fi Peter Pan (1991)

References

External links

1932 births
2019 deaths
Romanian film directors
Romanian male film actors